VOA – Heavy Rock Festival (formerly VOA Fest and Vagos Open Air) is an open-air heavy metal/hard rock festival held annually in Lisbon, Portugal. The festival is being held since 2009 in four different locations: the first four editions, from 2009 to 2012, were held in Calvão (a small town in the municipality of Vagos, near Aveiro), the next three (2013 to 2015) were held in the town of Vagos, the following two editions (2016 and 2017) were held in Corroios, a city in the municipality of Seixal, and after a year break the festival is scheduled to return in 2019 in Lisbon. It is organized by Prime Artists, a Portuguese event promoter.

The origins of a music festival in the Aveiro region are traced to a small event, called Rock in Ria, featuring a few Portuguese and international bands, but in 2009 that event gave way to a new full-fledged international festival which turned out to be one of the biggest heavy metal festivals in Portugal.

In late 2015, it was then announced the festival would relocate from Vagos to the city of Corroios. The name of the festival was also changed from Vagos Open Air to VOA Fest.

A few months later, the municipality of Vagos ensured the creation of a new heavy metal festival in the city, named Vagos Metal Fest. The new festival held the first edition in 2016, featuring Dark Funeral and Helloween as headliners. It is organized by Amazing Events, a Portuguese event promoter.

In 2018, after a sabbatical year, Prime Artists announced on their Facebook page the return of the event for 2019. It will return to a two-day festival, on July 4 and 5, change name (to VOA – Heavy Rock Festival), change location and venue (moving to Estádio do Restelo in city of Lisbon) and have Slipknot – one of the biggest names to ever perform in the festival – as one of the headliners.

In 2022, the last and final festival took place in Estádio Nacional, in Oeiras.

Lineups

2009
The year of 2009 saw the first incarnation of the festival, a two-day event held on Friday, 7 August and Saturday, 8 August at GD Calvão's football ground (Campo de Futebol Padre Batista) in the village of Calvão, near Vagos.

2010
The 2010 edition was held on Friday, 6 August and Saturday, 7 August.

2011
The 2011 edition was held on Friday, 5 August and Saturday, 6 August.

2012
The 2012 edition was held on Friday, 3 August and Saturday, 4 August.

2013
The 2013 edition was held on Friday, 9 August and Saturday, 10 August. The festival was moved to Quinta do Ega, a place in the city of Vagos.

2014
The 2014 edition saw Vagos Open Air became a three-day festival with the addition of Sunday. It was held on Friday, 8 August, Saturday, 9 August and Sunday, 10 August.

2015
The 2015 edition was held on Friday, 7 August, Saturday, 8 August and Sunday, 9 August. It was the final edition in the municipality of Vagos.

2016
The 2016 edition was held on Friday, 5 August and Saturday, 6 August, returning to a two-day lineup. The festival was renamed VOA Fest and moved to Quinta da Marialva, a place in the city of Corroios, Seixal. A new festival called Vagos Metal Fest was created exactly on the same location of the past editions.

2017
The 2017 edition returned to a three-day format. For the first time, the festival was held on two stages, as a new secondary stage was added (exclusive to Portuguese bands). It was held on Friday, 4 August, Saturday, 5 August and Sunday, 6 August.

2019
The 2019 edition will return once again to a two-day format. Renamed to VOA – Heavy Rock Festival, it will be held on Estádio do Restelo, in the city of Lisbon, on Thursday, 4 July and Friday, 5 July.

2022

The last and final 2022 edition happened in Estádio Nacional, in Oeiras,  on Thursday, 30 Jun, Friday, 1 July and Saturday, 2 July

External links
 Prime Artists official website
 VOA official website

References

Music festivals in Portugal
Heavy metal festivals in Portugal
2009 establishments in Portugal
Music festivals established in 2009
Annual events in Portugal
Summer events in Portugal